Politehnica is a metro station in Bucharest. It is one of the three stations located near the campus of the Universitatea Politehnica București (the other ones being Grozăveşti and Petrache Poenaru). The station was opened on 19 August 1983 as part of the extension from Eroilor to Industriilor.

The station also services the Faculty of Journalism of the University of Bucharest and its campus, the Apaca textiles factory and the headquarters of Vodafone Romania.

However, it sees relatively little traffic, as there are no residential quarters nearby, the area is extremely well serviced by RATB buses and trolleybuses, serving more useful routes than the subway and some Politehnica students use the more convenient Grozăveşti station.

The station is built around a wide, central platform, with exits at both ends of the station. The floor is built in black granite and marble, with white walls and white ceiling supported by two rows of thick, round white marble-clad columns.

References

Bucharest Metro stations
Railway stations opened in 1983
1983 establishments in Romania